We Sold Our Soul for Rock 'n' Roll is a compilation album by British heavy metal band Black Sabbath, originally released in January 1976 in the UK and 3 February 1976 in the US.

Album information
When Black Sabbath signed with NEMS, the label which would release their 1975 album Sabotage in the UK, NEMS acquired the band's back catalogue and wasted little time compiling this release. Authorized without the band's awareness by their previous manager, Patrick Meehan, the band would make no money whatsoever from the release. Although the band had six studio albums to its name at this point, this compilation drew heavily on the first four albums: this would also be a feature of most of the Osbourne-era compilations later released.

The original UK gatefold album, with a matte finish, featured a woman in a coffin holding what looks like a tin foil cross. Additionally, the original record retained Geezer Butler's bass solo before "N.I.B.", but this would be edited from later issues. Some US copies of the LP do not actually include "Wicked World" on the label or on the record itself, though it does appear on the cover. In the UK, "Wicked World" had been only a B-side and was relatively obscure.

Despite the album being an official release, Iommi has been quoted as saying that the first time the band knew of it was when asked to autograph copies which fans presented after concerts.

Reception

It was certified Silver in the UK by the BPI on 1 October 1976. In the US the RIAA certified the album as Gold on 7 February 1980, Platinum on 13 May 1986 and 2x Multi-Platinum (generally known as 'Double Platinum' outside the offices of the RIAA) on 16 March 2000.

Track listing

Personnel
 Ozzy Osbourne – lead vocals, harmonica 
 Tony Iommi – guitar, piano and Mellotron on Changes, synthesizer on ,Am I Going Insane (Radio)
 Geezer Butler – bass, Mellotron on Changes
 Bill Ward – drums, percussion

Charts

Certifications

Release history

References

External links 
 Black Sabbath - We Sold Our Soul for Rock 'n' Roll (1975) album review by Steve Huey, credits & releases at AllMusic
 Black Sabbath - We Sold Our Soul for Rock 'n' Roll (1975) album releases & credits at Discogs.com
 Black Sabbath - We Sold Our Soul for Rock 'n' Roll (1975) album credits & user reviews at ProgArchives.com
 Black Sabbath - We Sold Our Soul for Rock 'n' Roll (1975) album to be listened as stream at Spotify.com

Albums produced by Rodger Bain
Black Sabbath compilation albums
1976 compilation albums
Vertigo Records compilation albums
Warner Records compilation albums